Planet of Adventure is a science fiction setting sourcebook for the GURPS role-playing game system, adapted by James L. Cambias from the fiction of Jack Vance.

Contents
GURPS Planet of Adventure describes a distant world populated by many varied alien and half-alien races, set in the world of the Planet of Adventure series of novels by Jack Vance.

Publication history
The book was designed by James L. Cambias, and published by Steve Jackson Games in 2003.

Reception

References

External links
GURPS Planet of Adventure at Steve Jackson Games

Planet of Adventure
Role-playing game supplements introduced in 2003
Science fiction role-playing games